The 2005–06 Arizona Wildcats men's basketball team represented the University of Arizona during the 2005–06 NCAA Division I men's basketball season. The Wildcats, led by head coach Lute Olson, played their home games at the McKale Center and are members of the Pacific-10 Conference.

Recruiting class
Source:

Roster

Depth chart

Schedule

|-
!colspan=9 style="background:#; color:white;"| Regular season

|-
!colspan=9 style="background:#;"| Pac-10 tournament

|-
!colspan=9 style="background:#;"| NCAA tournament

|-

Awards
Hassan Adams
Pac-10 All-Conference 
Pac-10 Player of the Week – December 12, 2005
Pac-10 Player of the Week – January 2, 2006
Marcus Williams
Pac-10 All-Freshman First Team

Arizona Wildcats men's basketball seasons
Arizona Wildcats
Arizona Wildcats
Arizona Wildcats
Arizona